BRAC Uganda Bank Limited (BUBL), is a credit institution (′Tier II Financial Institution′) in Uganda. In April 2019, the institution received a Tier II Financial Institution Licence, which authorized it to operate as a bank, supervised by the Bank of Uganda, the national banking regulator.

Location
BRAC Uganda Bank Limited maintains headquarters at 880 Heritage Road, in the Nsambya neighborhood, in the Makindye Division, of Kampala, Uganda's capital ad largest city. The coordinates of the bank's headquarters are 0°17'53.0"N,  32°35'45.0"E (Latitude:0.298056; Longitude:32.595833).

Overview
BRAC Uganda Bank Limited is a Tier II Financial Institution (MFI), licensed by the Bank of Uganda, the central bank and national banking regulator. As a credit institution, it is not authorized to offer checking accounts or deal in foreign exchange. The company is authorized to take in customer deposits and to establish savings accounts. It is also authorized make collateralized and non-collateralized loans to savings and non savings customers. The company is a wholly owned subsidiary of BRAC International and is a member of their network. , the institution's total assets were valued at US$55.677 million (USh202.223 billion), with shareholder's equity of US$30.056 million (USh109.164 billion).

History
The institution was established in Uganda in 2006, as BRAC Microfinance Limited, with the objective of expanding financial inclusion in the country and serving the rural poor, specially women. At the time it acquired Tier II banking status in April 2019, the bank served over 270,000 customers in at least 80 of Uganda's 136 districts.

Ownership
BRAC Uganda Bank Limited, is a member of the international non-governmental development organisation, headquartered in Dhaka, Bangladesh, with subsidiaries in Afghanistan, Liberia, Myanmar, Nepal, Philippines, Sierra Leone, South Sudan, Tanzania and Uganda. BRAC Uganda is the second subsidiary to attain banking status, after the home subsidiary in Bangladesh.

Branch network
As of January 2021, BRAC Uganda maintained 163 branches across 84 districts in Uganda. Of these, 32 are fully networked branches regulated by the Bank of Uganda. The remaining 131 are satellite offices supporting outreach activities of the Bank.

See also

 Banking in Uganda
 List of banks in Uganda

References

External links
 Website of BRAC Uganda Bank Limited
 Website of BRAC Uganda Bank Limited
 Entry of new players healthy for financial sector - BOU As of 28 April 2019.

Banks of Uganda
Banks established in 2006
2006 establishments in Uganda
Makindye Division